Nathan "Nate" Brannen (born 8 September 1982) is a Canadian retired middle-distance runner from Cambridge, Ontario, who competed at three Summer Olympics: 2008, 2012 and 2016. Brannen is a graduate of the University of Michigan.

He is affiliated with the Phoenix Athletics Association of Ontario.

Brannen currently holds four Canadian track and field records: in the indoor and outdoor 1,000 metres (2:16.86 indoor, 2:16.52 outdoor), 2,000 metres (4:59.56), and the indoor one-mile (3:54.32).

Brannen is currently the Cross Country head coach at St. Edward High School in Lakewood, Ohio.

Running career
As an 18-year-old student at Preston High School in his hometown of Cambridge, Ontario, Brannen became only the seventh sub-four-minute high school mile recorder in the history of North America, at the 2001 Aileen Meagher Track Classic in Halifax, Nova Scotia. Originally, Brannen intended to join University of Arkansas and their prestigious track program but ended up being recruited by University of Michigan, in the same recruiting class as Alan Webb.

In July 2016, he was named to Canada's Olympic team. He finished 10th in the finals of the 1,500m in Rio.

Personal bests

See also
 Canadian records in track and field

References

External links
 
 sports-reference

1982 births
Living people
Athletes (track and field) at the 2006 Commonwealth Games
Athletes (track and field) at the 2008 Summer Olympics
Athletes (track and field) at the 2012 Summer Olympics
Athletes (track and field) at the 2016 Summer Olympics
Canadian male middle-distance runners
Commonwealth Games silver medallists for Canada
Olympic track and field athletes of Canada
People from Cambridge, Ontario
Track and field athletes from Ontario
Athletes (track and field) at the 2015 Pan American Games
Pan American Games silver medalists for Canada
University of Michigan alumni
Commonwealth Games medallists in athletics
Pan American Games medalists in athletics (track and field)
People from Avon Lake, Ohio
Canadian Track and Field Championships winners
Medalists at the 2015 Pan American Games
Medallists at the 2006 Commonwealth Games